The , begun in 1878 and completed in 1880, is a lock on the canal beside the Kitakami River in Ishinomaki, Miyagi Prefecture, Japan. Designed by Dutch engineer Cornelis Johannes van Doorn, who was a foreign advisor to the Meiji government, it is the earliest example of such a facility in Japan.

The lock measures 50.6 meters in length and 8.6 meters in width, and took an estimated 500,000 red bricks and 2000 labourers to complete. The original gate was made of wood, but was replaced by a  steel gate in 1966.

In 2002, it was designated as an Important Cultural Property of Japan.

See also
Tatsuta polder sluice gates
Foreign government advisors in Meiji Japan
Mechanical Engineering Heritage (Japan)
Important Cultural Properties of Japan
Rangaku

References

External links
Miyagi Prefectural Government official site 

Science and technology in Japan
Canals in Japan
Buildings of the Meiji period
Locks of Japan
Transport infrastructure completed in 1880
Ishinomaki
Important Cultural Properties of Japan
Buildings and structures in Miyagi Prefecture
Transport in Miyagi Prefecture